Andrew Morgado is an American voice actor, film writer, ADR mixer and sound editor. He is best known for voicing characters in animated films, animation and video games, such as Cliffjumper in Bumblebee (2018), Sanjar Nandi in The Outer Worlds (2019) and Kouichi Adachi in Yakuza: Like a Dragon (2020).

Career
Morgado's career began in 2003 when he lent a voice of an unnamed character and many others in the video game Command & Conquer: Generals.

From 2012 to 2014, he served as a narrator on the reality television series Insane Coaster Wars. Afterwards, he provided several announcer voices on sitcoms, such as Hot in Cleveland, Tosh.0, The X-Files, Fresh Off the Boat and Game Shakers. He also served as a sound editor on the very first episode of the television series Fargo, "The Crocodile's Dilemma", for which he earned an Primetime Emmy Award nomination for Outstanding Sound Editing in a Drama Television Series, along with his fellow sound editors.

In 2018, he provided the voice of the character Bruno Delacroix in the action video game Call of Duty: Black Ops 4. A year later, he voiced Kollector in the martial arts video game Mortal Kombat 11 (2019).

In 2020, he provided the English voice of Kouichi Adachi in the martial arts video game for PlayStation 4, Yakuza: Like a Dragon.

Filmography

Film

Television

Video games

References

External links
 

Living people
American male video game actors
American male voice actors
American sound editors
21st-century American male actors
Year of birth missing (living people)